Wladimiro de Liguoro (11 October 1893 – 31 August 1968) was an Italian actor and film director. He was the son of the director Giuseppe de Liguoro and the brother of Eugenio de Liguoro. He was the husband of the film star Rina De Liguoro, who took her stage name from him.

Selected filmography
 La statua di carne (1912)
 Verdi (1913)
 La bella corsara (1928)

References

Bibliography 
 Phillips, Alastair & Vincendeau, Ginette. Journeys of Desire: European Actors in Hollywood. British Film Institute, 2006.

External links 
 

1893 births
1968 deaths
Italian male film actors
Italian film directors
19th-century Neapolitan people
20th-century Italian male actors